The Hong Kong Film Award for Best Film From Mainland And Taiwan is a retired annual Hong Kong industry award presented for a film considered the best of the year. In order to be eligible for the award films had to be in a Chinese language and have at least one film company legally registered in Mainland China or Taiwan.

History
This award replaced the Hong Kong Film Award for Best Asian Film.
The first award was presented during the 2012 31st Hong Kong Film Awards ceremony for the film You Are the Apple of My Eye directed by Giddens Ko.
This award has been replaced by the Hong Kong Film Award for Best Asian Chinese Language Film since the 39th Hong Kong Film Awards.

Winners and nominees

See also
Hong Kong Film Award for Best Asian Chinese Language Film

References

External links

Hong Kong Film Awards
Awards established in 2012
Awards disestablished in 2020